Aliya High School for Boys previously known as Madrassa-e-Aliya is a government owned school located at Gunfoundry, Hyderabad.

History
The school was established in 1872 during the reign of the Nizams for the elite and served the city's nobility, was supposedly one of the best schools in Hyderabad till the 1960s.

It was managed by Anglo-Indians, but after Operation Polo the school management was brought under the control of the state government which reportedly brought about its downfall. The school building is listed as a heritage building. The school was renamed 1948, the school then known as Madrassa-e-Aliya was founded by Salar Jung I in the Nizam College premises. The school which once served the elite and the nobility now caters to the children of poor.

Alumni

See also
Education in India
List of schools in India

References

External links 

Schools in the princely states of India
High schools and secondary schools in Hyderabad, India
1872 establishments in India
Heritage structures in Hyderabad, India
Establishments in Hyderabad State